Year 7 Class 1 (Hangul: 칠학년일반) is a South Korean girl group formed by DRB Entertainment in Seoul, South Korea. The group debuted on January 24, 2014 with "Oppa Virus".

Members
 Baek Se-hee (백세희)
 Kang Min-ju (강민주)
 Shin Ee-rang (신이랑)
 Kwon So-jung (권소정)
 Han Bit-na (한빛나)
 Yoo Hwa (유화)
 Go Eun-sil (고은실)

Discography

Extended plays

References

K-pop music groups
South Korean girl groups
South Korean dance music groups
Musical groups from Seoul
Musical groups established in 2014
2014 establishments in South Korea
South Korean pop music groups